Shigandang (Japanese:  ishigantō) is an ornamental stone tablet with writing, which is used to exorcise evil spirits in east Asia. 石敢當 are often associated with Mount Tai, and are often placed on street intersections or three-way junctions, especially in the crossing, which is often considered a spiritually dangerous place.

Erecting Taishan shi-gan-dang nearby the houses, villages, bridges and roads has a long history in China. The phrase “石敢當” first appeared in Han Dynasty. During Tang Dynasty, these three characters have been carved on stones and were used to protect houses from evil things. Until Song Dynasty “Taishan shi-gan-dang” came out. It had been widely popular throughout the country to set up “石敢當” or “泰山石敢當” near villages and houses. What's more, this custom has also been spread to Han cultural circle overseas. No other Chinese folk-beliefs can compare with it considering its wideness. However, shi-gan-dang's function has been diversified that it not only prevents people from evil things, but also from wind, water and disasters. 泰山石敢當 has been listed among the first batch of national nonmaterial cultural heritage in 2006. Now this thousand-year-old belief has been protected as an important nonmaterial cultural heritage.

Apart from Shigandang, another option is to place a stone with Nāmó Ēmítuófó.

See also 
 Shi Gandang 
 Bagua (八卦)
 Chinese folk religion
 Chinese ritual mastery traditions
 Chinese spiritual world concepts
 Fu Lu (符籙)
 Kai Guang (開光)
 Spirit tablets

Notes

Architecture in China
Architecture in Japan
Taoist architecture
Taoist practices